is a Japanese actor who is represented by the talent agency Anima.

Filmography

Television
 Akai Himitsu (TBS, 1985)
 Keiji Monogatari '85 (1985)
 Thirteen Boy (1985)
 Shitetsu Ensen 97 Bunsho (episode 64) (1985)
 Choushinsei Flashman (TV Asahi, 1986 - 1987) - Bun / Blue Flash
 Tsuukai! Fukei Kouhosei yarukkyanai Mon! (TV Asahi, 1987)
 Saturday Wide Gekijou "Fuji Sanroku Satsujin Jiken" (TV Asahi, 1987)
 Hikari Sentai Maskman (TV Asahi, 1987) - Hikari (Guron Doggler)
 Tsubasa wo kudasai (NHK, 1988)
 Choujin Sentai Jetman (TV Asahi, 1991) - Back Dimension Dimension Soldiers Ray

Film
 Choushinsei Flashman (Toei, 1986) - Bun / Blue Flash
 Kisuyori Kantan (Toei Classics, 1989) - Suzunari
 Zansatsu seyo: Setsuna kimono, Sore wa Ai (Toei Classics, 1990)
 Uteba kagerou (Toei, 1991)
 Funky Monkey Teacher (Pony Canyon, 1992)

Anime
 Kanojo 2 (Asmik, 1990)
 Gokudou Monogatari: Hanachou Ikka Yondaime (Kasakura Publications, 1994)
 Janki 3: Chigai Houken Maajan (Tokuma Japan Communications, 1994)

References
『日本タレント名鑑'94』VIPタイムズ社、1994年、30頁。
『日本タレント名鑑'99』VIPタイムズ社、1999年、36頁。
「『超新星フラッシュマン』DVD発売記念! SPECIAL CROSS TALK 垂水藤太×植村喜八郎×石渡康浩」『東映ヒーローMAX』Vol.33、辰巳出版〈タツミムック〉、2010年、52-53頁。。
 http://www.japan-takumi.jp/special_page/18.html
 超世紀全戦隊大全集 1993, p. 188, 「戦隊シリーズ キャストインタビュー 植村喜八郎」.

Living people
1967 births
Japanese male film actors
Japanese male television actors
Japanese male voice actors